Lady Shiva (real name Sandra San or more recently Sandra Wu-San) is a character appearing in American comic books published by DC Comics. The character was co-created by Dennis O'Neil and Ric Estrada, and first appeared in Richard Dragon, Kung Fu Fighter #5. Over time, she has become more closely associated with Batman and related characters, both as an enemy and an ally. She is a martial arts grandmaster and one of the most skilled combatants in the DC Universe. She is an assassin-for-hire who specializes in killing her targets with her bare hands, and is the mother of Cassandra Cain, aka Batgirl.

Fictional character biography

Becoming Lady Shiva

Pre-Crisis

Shiva's first introduced as an antagonist to martial artist Richard Dragon, believing him to be a spy responsible for the murder of her sister, Carolyn. In reality, Carolyn's murder was orchestrated by Guano Cravat, a corrupt businessman whose criminal ambitions had been foiled by Dragon. Cravat convinced Woosan that Dragon killed Carolyn, deliberately pitting her against Dragon in an act of revenge.

To avenge her sister, Woosan becomes a master combatant. During the course of her training, she discovers that she is a prodigy, rapidly mastering several martial arts and eventually dubbing herself "Lady" Shiva.

When Shiva tracks Dragon down and lures him to Cravat's hideout, Dragon reveals Cravat's deception. The Swiss, Carolyn's real murderer and Cravat's underling, had already died in battle with Dragon, rendering Shiva's vendetta moot.

Afterward, she briefly takes up crimefighting with Dragon and fellow martial artist Ben Turner, to allay her feelings of purposelessness, saying "I tolerate Dragon because danger seems to cling to him like flies to honey... and without danger my life is empty!"  Dragon, in hopes that she might follow his example and use her skills for good, coaxes her to explore the spiritual side of martial arts, to no apparent success. When the three eventually part ways, Shiva begins a wandering existence, training herself further, and eventually parlaying her skills into a career as a master assassin.

Post-Crisis
Shiva was born in a shanty town, in an unknown country, and raised to be a warrior and protector of the village. Eventually, Shiva fled the village with her sister. Years later, when the heroine Black Canary visits the village to experience Shiva's training, a village child named Sin is held hostage by the villagers, with the promise that if Canary fails to become the warrior-protector of the village, Sin is to take her place, suggesting that Shiva's sister was once used in a similar manner. Speaking about her childhood, Sin says that Ra's al Ghul's League of Assassins ran the village where she and Shiva were born and raised.

The sisters moved to Detroit, Michigan, using the names Sandra and Carolyn Wu-San. There, they devoted their time to practicing the martial arts. Because of the girls' young ages, talent, and unique bond as sisters, their practice evolved into a secret, perfected language that only they could share. Out of love for her sister, Sandra held back in her spars with Carolyn. The assassin David Cain saw this restraint in Sandra one day when he visited Detroit to see the siblings perform. Considering Sandra a kindred spirit, Cain murdered Carolyn to remove the obstruction that blunted Sandra's true potential.

Discovering that David Cain had murdered her sister, Sandra hunted him down, only to be lured into an ambush by Ra's al Ghul's League of Assassins, of which Cain was a member. In the heat of a losing battle, Sandra realized how Carolyn had held her back, and how much undeveloped potential she had. Cain spared her life, and in exchange, Sandra agreed to bear Cain a child, and leave it for him to raise. The child, Cassandra Cain, was to be Ra's al Ghul's "One Who is All", a perfected bodyguard, whose only form of communication was literacy in body language, and whose sole instinct was for hand-to-hand combat. With Carolyn gone, Cassandra and Sandra were the only two humans known to share this gift. The day of Cassandra's birth, Sandra set out to become reborn as the Lady Shiva: creator and destroyer.

Professional assassin

Meeting the Question
During her time with Richard Dragon, Shiva becomes addicted to combat and life-or-death situations. Already a very accomplished martial artist, Shiva hires herself out as a mercenary both to recapture the thrill and to finance further training. Her considerable skills allow her to ask a high price for her services, and she soon becomes highly sought after.

Shiva is eventually hired by Reverend Hatch, the corrupt adjunct to the mayor of Hub City, to fight troublesome masked crimefighter the Question. She defeats him with ease, but rather than have Shiva kill him, Hatch instead has his men beat the Question further, shoot him in the head with an air gun, and dump him into the river. Seeing "a passion for combat" in the hero, Shiva rescues a near-death Question, and brings him to Richard Dragon's mountain hideaway, to give him a chance to fulfill his potential. In his civilian identity as Victor Sage, the Question enters Dragon's tutelage, training in combat and undergoing a spiritual awakening.

On leaving Dragon, Sage meets Shiva, who orders him to fight her. She ends the fight after only a few moves, and confirms her own suspicions of a "warrior's passion" in him, because he was willing to fight her even after his previous, crushing defeat. However, influenced by Dragon's philosophy, Sage proposes that he was simply "curious" what would happen if they fought again. Shiva leaves without telling Sage why she saved him, and Sage readopts the identity of the Question, returning to Hub City.

Shiva and the O-Sensei
Shiva eventually travels to Manchuria to visit with her godfather, the O-Sensei, former instructor of Richard Dragon and Bronze Tiger. After living over 150 years, he has finally decided to die. He intends to keep a promise to his wife, and be buried alongside her, but his wife's family had hidden her remains to punish him for abandoning her. The O-Sensei has Shiva select three warriors to aid him in the search for her remains: the Question, Green Arrow, and Batman. Reluctant to acknowledge the O-Sensei's death wish, Shiva expresses her ambivalence both verbally and physically, unnecessarily applying deadly force in battles with O-Sensei's assailants.

Shiva and the O-Sensei then travel to Hub City, meeting with the Question, who, in turn, brokered Shiva's first meeting with Batman. Compelled to test his skill, Shiva immediately fights the vigilante only to be stopped by the O-Sensei. They do, however, convince Batman to aid them.

In their search for Green Arrow, Shiva encounters slave traders, killing all except one, who successfully cuts her; she rewards him with a kiss on the forehead. After locating Green Arrow, she meets Black Canary for the first time, and spars with the hero. Although Canary does not know it at the time, the two had both studied under Sensei Otomo, though non-concurrently.

After recruiting Green Arrow, Shiva returns to Hub City, and saves the Question from an attack by former employees of the now-dead Reverend Hatch. Shiva kills the men, who had been after a fortune in embezzled funds stored in Hatch's abandoned home, and sets fire to the money. Later, she nurses the Question's elderly friend Tot back to health. While the Question puzzles over her inscrutable and violent nature, she confesses that the O-Sensei was "the one man I am certain I would not harm if he kissed me".

When Batman discovers that the remains of the O-Sensei's wife had been moved to a small island, Shiva, the O-Sensei, Green Arrow, and the Question set out for the island, only to be caught in a storm. The O-Sensei is lost overboard, but the group discovers that his wife's remains had likewise been mislaid, years earlier, while in transport, leaving O-Sensei's promise fulfilled.

Toward Sodom and Gomorrah
When Hub City falls victim to rapid, systemic urban decay, Shiva returns to offer her services to one of the ruling gangs, but instead kills the members for sending "unskilled" men to kill her. On meeting the Question, she is dismayed to find that staying in Hub City has atrophied his fighting skills. Nevertheless, she repeatedly saves both him and his lover, Mayor Myra Fermin, from assassins.

She vanishes sometime later, only to reappear stepping out of a helicopter meant to rescue the Question and his companions, who have decided to flee the city. Shiva explains that though the Question and his friends wished to leave, it is now a fit place for her to go toward. The Question and Shiva have a final exchange before he leaves.

After Hub City
Shiva continues to work as a mercenary for money, challenge, and perfection of her skills. Eventually, she crosses paths with the League of Assassins, and its leader, Ra's al Ghul, and begins an on-and-off association with them. Though she has kept close ties with the League, she sometimes works against their interests, as seen during Batman: Legacy.

While training prospective assassins, mercenaries, and terrorists in war-torn country, she is approached by Jason Todd, the second Robin, and his guardian Batman, acting on evidence that she had associated with Todd's father, and speculating that she might be his mother.

Eager to finally face Batman uninterrupted, Shiva knocks Robin unconscious and challenges the Dark Knight. Initially underestimating Shiva, Batman soon learns that her skills are such that she could kill him, and begins to fight in earnest. It takes intervention from Robin to knock Shiva unconscious and subdue her for interrogation. When asked if she was Jason's mother, Shiva laughs, sarcastically claiming to have littered dozens of babies across the globe. When Batman doses her with sodium pentothal, Shiva claims to have no children, confirming that Jason is not her son. Batman leaves her in the desert, reasoning that she would soon free herself from her bonds. Shiva warns him that they would meet again, to which Batman simply replies "Too bad".

Later, Shiva begins to track down those who referred to themselves as Shihan, "Master", or any other title proclaiming mastery of a martial arts form. She would learn what she could from them and, depending on their skill and personal whim, kill them when they were of no further use to her.

Teaching a Little Bird
In further pursuit of her art, Shiva tracks the defeats of martial arts masters to discover new techniques. In this way, she develops an interest in the defeat of Koroshi, master of the art of empty-handed fighting. Gaining no information from Koroshi himself, she begins to search for King Snake, the man rumored to have defeated him. During her search, she meets Tim Drake, who is fighting King Snake's criminal organization, the Ghost Dragons, as part of his training to become the third Robin.

Shiva sees potential in Drake, and takes him on as a student for a few weeks. As a bonus, she offers to train him in one weapon, and he chooses the bo staff. Shiva derisively mentions that it is not a lethal weapon, and Drake explains that was the reason he had chosen it. At the end of his training, he defeats Shiva in a sparring match with the bo by using a whistle to distract her, and she gives him a collapsible bo staff.

Eventually, they discover that the Ghost Dragons are creating a virulent plague. Robin, Shiva, and ally Clyde Rawlins attempt to stop them from releasing it, but the Dragons escape with a few canisters. After tracking them to Hong Kong, they eventually defeat King Snake, though Rawlins dies in the attempt and Shiva mostly witnesses the proceedings. While King Snake hangs precariously on the ledge of a building, Shiva orders Robin to kill him to signify his "graduation" and become her "weapon". Robin refuses and leaves. Shiva then throws King Snake off the ledge herself, though he survives the fall.

Getting involved with Gotham

After Bane breaks Batman's back, Batman seeks training from Shiva to help him regain his skills and fighting spirit (see Batman: Knightfall: KnightsEnd). Though she deems him unworthy of her efforts, she devises a training regimen, out of respect for what he had been before his injuries. As part of this training, Shiva kills the Armless Master, a sensei notable for training Catwoman, while wearing a tengu mask, making sure that his death was both witnessed and relayed to his best students. Shiva then makes Batman wear the mask while performing training missions. He is then ambushed by the master's students, who mistake him for the "Tengu Mask warrior". He defeats all of them in turn, but Shiva attempts to complete Batman's training by manipulating him into killing an opponent using her fatal Leopard Blow. Batman simply feigns using the maneuver on an assailant to trick her into believing he used lethal force. Shiva later discovers the truth, but does not seek vengeance.

Later, she helps Batman fight Ra's al Ghul and his League of Assassins, including Bane, when Ghul attempts to release a deadly virus called Ebola Gulf A that would have killed half the world's population (see Batman: Legacy). The trail leads Batman to Calcutta, India. Since their knowledge of the city is limited, Oracle contacts Shiva, who agrees to help Batman. Together they defeat Ghul's men and prevent the virus from being released.

Shiva later travels to an army base in Transbelvia to fight a young political rebel and martial artist named Dava Sbörsc, who specializes in undefeatable "single-blow techniques" and wishes to learn Shiva's Leopard Blow. Instead, Dava's friend, her former pupil Tim Drake, in his identity as Robin, jumps into the fray in her place. Granted superspeed by a drug Dava gave him, and unused to its effects, Robin unwittingly uses lethal force, killing Shiva in battle. He quickly administers CPR, both reviving Shiva and dosing her with the drug. Thus enhanced, she kills attacking soldiers while Robin and Dava make their escape, vanishing immediately after.

During the No Man's Land story arc, Shiva fights in the Brotherhood of the Monkey Fist's martial arts tournament under the alias "Paper Monkey". In a final, close battle, she fights and defeats Connor Hawke, the Green Arrow. As repayment for saving her life, Robin asks her to spare Connor. She relents, warning Robin that this use of her favor means she would challenge and kill him when he grew older.

Over the years, Shiva amasses groups of followers who worship her as an incarnation of Shiva, the Hindu representation of the lord of destruction. She pays them little attention, occasionally using them as lackeys or killing them when it suits her whims. Some of her followers have even created temples to honor her victories, one of which is in Gotham, which she later destroys.

Shiva and Batgirl
At age 8, Shiva's daughter Cassandra flees from David Cain, horrified after killing a man with her bare hands on her first assassination. She then wanders the world as a mute, and, seeking redemption, finds herself in Gotham City during the events of No Man's Land. Seeing promise in Cassandra, Batman and former Batgirl, Barbara Gordon, give Cassandra their blessings to take up the mantle of Batgirl.

Eventually, Batgirl's skills attract Shiva's attention. Without telling her of their relationship, Shiva challenges Batgirl to a battle to the death. To Shiva's disappointment, she defeats Batgirl soundly. Batgirl's body language fluency is newly impaired by a telepath's forcible inculcation of the ability to speak. Wanting to fight Batgirl at her peak, Shiva spares her life, and promises to retrain her on the condition that they have a rematch in one year. The secret to being undefeatable, Shiva explains, is to not fear death, even to seek it. Under Shiva's care, Batgirl soon regains her abilities.

Shiva reappears to fight Batgirl at the Forum of The Twelve Caesars, and kills her in combat. Realizing that Batgirl had not given her all, Shiva revives her. Batgirl admits to harboring a death wish ever since Cain first forced her to kill; her ability to perfectly read the agony of her victim had deeply traumatized her. Having overcome her death wish, Batgirl fights Shiva again, shattering her sword. In the midst of battle, Batgirl accuses Shiva of having a death wish herself, really only traveling and fighting in search of her own death. Batgirl thus defeats Shiva.

A new Sensei
In Gail Simone's Birds of Prey series, during a joint hunt with Black Canary for the murderer of a shared, beloved sensei, a sensei Shiva so respected that she has vowed to never use anything he taught her in a fight where her goal was the death of her opponent, Shiva is beaten and kidnapped by supervillain Cheshire. Cheshire ties up, gags and locks Shiva in the trunk of a car wired with explosives, so as to use a charred corpse in a plan to fake her death and flee the country after murdering a senator. Shiva is saved when Catwoman discovers her. After Cheshire confesses to murdering their sensei, Black Canary punches her out of a helicopter (using Ted Grant's Haymaker) to prevent Shiva from killing her in a vengeful rage. Shiva subsequently offers to share her knowledge with Black Canary, who takes her offer under consideration.

Cassandra begins to suspect that Shiva is her mother, but cannot provoke Cain into an admission. She embarks on a search for Shiva, eventually finding her as the new sensei of the League of Assassins under the leadership of Nyssa Raatko, Ra's al Ghul's eldest daughter. In battle, Cassandra sacrifices her life to save former League member Tigris from an attack by her own unsuccessful experimental predecessor, Mad Dog. Shiva decides to resurrect Cassandra in a Lazarus Pit to reveal the truth of her heritage, and fight her once more.

On reviving her, Shiva admits that the reason she agreed to give birth was that she hoped her child would be the one to kill her. In an evenly matched battle, Cassandra breaks Shiva's neck, paralyzing her. She appears ready to place Shiva in the Lazarus Pit, but Shiva pleads with her not to do so. In response, Cassandra impales Shiva on a hook hanging over the pit, apparently killing her. Although Cassandra's intent regarding this action is left ambiguous, whether to kill her or let her fall into the pit and be revived, it has been confirmed that Shiva is alive in One Year Later. Cassandra then abandons the identity of Batgirl and returns to her life as a wanderer.

During the Infinite Crisis storyline, Shiva later appears as a member of Alexander Luthor Jr.'s Secret Society of Super Villains.

"One Year Later"

In the 2006 "One Year Later" storyline, having switched places with Black Canary to allow them both to experience each other's life experiences, Shiva joins Oracle's covert team of female operatives known as the Birds of Prey (with Canary hoping that spending time with them would soften Shiva), using the name "Jade Canary". Shiva remains unchanged, however. Oracle semiseriously refers to Shiva as a sociopath, and refuses to call Shiva by the Jade Canary title, even though Shiva (as part of the deal with Canary) has taken to wearing Black Canary's boots and trademark fishnet stockings (though she hates wearing them).

Shiva continues to perform solo work, and visits Robin to assist him (much to Robin's chagrin) in discovering the truth behind Batgirl's recent disappearance and recent upheaval within the League of Assassins. She refuses to allow herself or Oracle's team to be involved, and instead trusts her former pupil to handle the situation. It appears that she holds no ill-will towards Cassandra as she informs Tim that she hopes that her daughter is well.

During a recent mission, Oracle's team confronts the villain Prometheus, whose helmet allows him to copy the skills of 30 of the world's greatest martial artists, including Shiva herself. This had allowed him a victory against Batman in the past. Shiva believes that his files on her would be out of date, and that she would be able to defeat her "old self". She seems unconcerned about the skills of the other 29 fighters, and apparently decides to attack Prometheus head-on. Prometheus, however, has more up-to-date files than Shiva suspected, and in three seconds knocks her to the ground. After this defeat, Shiva vanishes, leaving a message for Black Canary: "Tell the Canary, I release her".

Stripped of her chance to mold Black Canary in her own image, and stripped of Sin, the young girl who was next in line as her successor, Shiva is last seen talking to Bethany Thorne, daughter of the late Crime Doctor. It appears that she is yet again hoping to train a new heir in the art of her lethal form of martial arts.

Still, although Shiva is no longer an active member of the Birds of Prey, she continues to be protective of her former teammates. Such is the case when the Birds of Prey are being threatened by Spy Smasher, who attempts to steal control away from Oracle. After a mission in Russia, Oracle and Spy Smasher fight against one another for control of the team. Although Oracle is unable to use her legs, she is victorious, although Spy Smasher attempts to go back on their deal. Unfortunately, she is confronted outside by every single living Birds of Prey Agent Oracle has ever recruited, who warn her against ever going after Oracle again; Lady Shiva is among them. When Barbara later asks the others who called Shiva, no one responds.

"Blackest Night"
During the events of the "Blackest Night", Shiva tracks down Renee Montoya, the new Question, and tells her she intends to test her in battle. The two women begin their duel, only to be interrupted when Victor Sage, now a reanimated Black Lantern, arrives on the scene and attacks them. Using his new supernatural abilities, Sage effortlessly defeats Shiva and tries to kill her by tearing out her heart. However, Shiva realizes that the Black Lanterns feed on human emotion, and cuts herself off from all feeling through the use of meditation, rendering her invisible to Sage. After the others on the scene do the same, Victor angrily departs.

"Brightest Day"
During the events of the "Brightest Day" crossover, a new martial artist known as the White Canary comes to Gotham and sets a plan into motion to ruin Black Canary's life by framing her for the murder of a European terrorist. When Black Canary first encounters the White Canary, she muses that the villain may be Shiva in disguise. but later White Canary pits Black Canary against Lady Shiva in an honor bound match to the death after breaking Black Canary's wrist, thereby making sure she would be killed. Both parties accept because White Canary dangles the life of Sin, Black Canary's adopted daughter, as her bait. However, the Huntress challenges Shiva instead and even manages to knock her down, to everyone's surprise, even after receiving many blows. The death match is stopped when Black Canary rescues Sin herself and points out a technicality, they need not continue the battle to the death immediately and can pick it up at any time in the future.

The New 52
In The New 52 (a 2011 reboot of the DC Comics universe), Lady Shiva appears in Nightwing (vol. 3) #0. While initially meant only to provide information, Dick Grayson enters the field against orders when Batman is wounded. He fights her in his debut as Robin with a costume composed of spare Bat costume parts. Lady Shiva easily defeats him but praises his fighting skills and tells him he has too much potential to stay in Batman's shadow. Before leaving, Shiva tells Dick Grayson to come find her once he's ready to unlock his full potential. 

In issue #13, she returns to Gotham City several years later to kill another target and Dick Grayson, now Nightwing, sets out to stop her. He's surprised to see that she remembers him from their first encounter and even more so when she praises his progress since their last meeting. She repeats that he's squandering his natural talent by not learning from her. Shiva completes her mission by throwing an axe at the S.E.C building door (to intimidate into initiating lockdown) but quickly realises that Nightwing was already injured before their fight. To Dick Grayson's surprise she says that him fighting at a disadvantage shows more than he knows and that he has too much skill to kill without a concrete reason. It is later revealed that Penguin hired her AND told Nightwing about her mission in the hopes that either he'd be saved from paying Shiva's high fees, or that she would kill Nightwing.

She is later revealed to be a League of Assassins member who taught Red Hood along with Bronze Tiger. She fights alongside Bronze Tiger, Cheshire, December Graystone, Rictus, and Red Hood as the Untitled infiltrated the League of Assassin's secret city.

Instead of her traditional black coat, the New 52 version of Shiva has appeared in a teal kabuki-like garb and mask, and is shown to be a master of weapons and martial arts, going to battle with throwing knives, swords, and usually a pair of kusarigama. In full gear she appears to have an extremely long, auburn braid with blades embedded in the hair that can be used offensively, but this is merely a wig connected to her mask. With the hooded mask off, her hair is shown to be black, and while it appears cropped in one issue, it is medium length in following issues. The character December Greystone is extremely similar in appearance to Lady Shiva's pre-New 52 look, but is a male and spell caster. 
In all of her appearances so far, she has soundly defeated nearly every opponent, including Batman, Nightwing, and Arsenal. But when she engages Red Hood, her own arrogance gets the better of her, as he is able to defeat her with a simple chop to the neck that she taught him long ago, as a way of balancing their sparring lessons because she believed he could never actually beat her without using "shortcuts".

DC Rebirth

She appears in the flesh at the end of Detective Comics #950, observing Cassandra Cain from a rooftop. Batman later finds out from both Shiva herself and Ra's that she has separated from him & the League of Assassins, believing him to be too complacent with the wealthy and aiming for peace rather than destruction. She had taken Ra's' secret League of Shadows with her, and was responsible for multiple attacks across the city and attacks on the anti-League military squad, the Colony. After a duel with her daughter Cassandra, Ra's Al Ghul appears and shoots Shiva with a rifle. Ra's takes her body with the intent of resurrecting her for questioning.

Powers and abilities
Lady Shiva has no superpowers, but she is regarded as one of the best assassins and martial artists on the planet. She is known to have mastered numerous martial arts, including kung fu, judo, jujutsu, wing chun, capoeira, savate, karate, aikido, kobudō, taekwondo and eskrima. She is able to read people's movements through their body language, predicting their movements beforehand. She taught this trick to her daughter Cassandra Cain. She is able to hold her own against multiple opponents. She is commonly seen as the world's foremost martial artist, as powerful as Richard Dragon and Batman. Batman, who is also considered to be one of the greatest martial artists, stated that "she may well be the best fighter alive".

Although she is willing to kill, and on one occasion attempted to manipulate Batman into a position where he would have to kill to make a worthy opponent in the future, Shiva has shown a certain sense of honor, helping to train the third Robin in combat while working with him during an investigation, and assisting Batman in regaining his skills after he was injured by Bane and lost his fighting instinct even after his back was healed. She has also been noted as having some respect for her old teachers; when she and Black Canary learned that they had each studied under Sensei Otomo, Shiva noted that, out of respect for Otomo's preference not to kill his opponents, she never uses the skills he taught her in fights where her goal is the death of her enemies.

In other media

Television

 Lady Shiva appears in a self-titled episode of Birds of Prey, portrayed by Sung-Hi Lee. This version is a freelance thief and former schoolmate of Helena Kyle who seeks vengeance on Barbara Gordon for the accidental death of her 15-year-old sister, who was killed years prior while Gordon as Batgirl was trying to apprehend Shiva.
 Lady Shiva appears in Beware the Batman, voiced by Finola Hughes. This version is an elite member of the League of Assassins who shares rivalries with Katana and fellow Leaguer Silver Monkey, who seeks to usurp her position.
 Lady Shiva appears in Young Justice, voiced by Gwendoline Yeo. This version is a member of the League of Shadows and enforcer for the Light.
 According to Arrow recurring guest star Katrina Law, she believed that she was auditioning for Lady Shiva before being cast as Nyssa al Ghul.
 Lady Shiva was going to appear in the fourth season finale and the fifth season of Gotham, but this never came to pass.

Film
 Lady Shiva makes a cameo appearance in Superman/Batman: Public Enemies, voiced by Rachael MacFarlane.
 Lady Shiva makes a minor appearance in the DC Animated Movie Universe (DCAMU) film Batman: Hush, voiced by Sachie Alessio.
 Lady Shiva appears in the DCAMU film Justice League Dark: Apokolips War, voiced again by Sachie Alessio. Following Darkseid's invasion of Earth two years prior, this version serves as Damian Wayne's right hand, assisting him and the League of Shadows in their efforts in defeating Darkseid by securing a boom tube generator in a LexCorp building until she is killed by a LexCorp guard.
 Lady Shiva appears in Deathstroke: Knights & Dragons: The Movie, voiced by Panta Mosleh.
 Lady Shiva appears in Batman: Soul of the Dragon, voiced by Kelly Hu.

Video games
 Lady Shiva appears in DC Universe Online, voiced by DB Cooper.
 Lady Shiva appears as a playable character in the portable version of Lego Batman 2: DC Super Heroes.
 A young Lady Shiva appears in Batman: Arkham Origins, voiced by Kelly Hu. After being hired by the Joker to kill Batman, she tests the latter in a side mission to determine his worth to the League of Assassins. Additionally, she also appears as the final boss of the "Initiation" DLC.
 Lady Shiva appears as a playable character in Lego DC Super-Villains, voiced by Sumalee Montano.

Miscellaneous
 Lady Shiva appears in the Batman: Knightfall audio book, voiced by Lorelei King.
 A heroic version of Lady Shiva appears in DC Super Hero Girls, voiced by Tania Gunadi.
 Lady Shiva appears in Deathstroke: Knights and Dragons, voiced by Panta Mosleh.

Reception

In 2011, UGO Networks featured Lady Shiva on their list of 25 Hot Ninja Girls: "She's the type of woman who makes it obvious why Bruce Wayne never really found love - his type is all too capable of kicking his ass". She was ranked #8 on the list of Top 10 Fictional Ninjas by Fandomania for being "one of the deadliest martial artists in the DC Comics universe".

References

External links

 Women of Gotham Biography: Lady Shiva
 CanaryNoir

Characters created by Dennis O'Neil
Comics characters introduced in 1975
DC Comics female superheroes
DC Comics female supervillains
DC Comics martial artists
Black Canary characters
Asian-American superheroes
Fictional female assassins
Fictional female murderers
Fictional assassins in comics
Fictional characters from Detroit
Fictional female ninja
Fictional martial arts trainers
Fictional women soldiers and warriors
Video game bosses
Characters created by Ric Estrada
Chinese superheroes